Yuan Yung-cheng (born 12 November 2002) is a Taiwanese footballer who plays as a winger for Gran Tarajal.

Career

As a youth player, Yuan joined the youth academy of Chinese side Guangzhou City. In 2020, he signed for Tainan TSG in Taiwan, helping them win the league, their first major trophy. In 2021, he signed for Spanish fourth tier club Racing Rioja.

In 2022, Yuan signed for Gran Tarajal in the Spanish fifth tier.

References

Living people
2002 births

Association football wingers
Expatriate footballers in China
Expatriate footballers in Spain
Racing Rioja CF players
Segunda Federación players
Taiwanese expatriate footballers
Taiwanese expatriate sportspeople in China
Taiwanese expatriates in Spain
Taiwanese footballers
Tercera Federación players